Emtek Products is a door and cabinet hardware manufacturer based in the City of Industry, Los Angeles County. They are a subsidiary of Swedish company Assa Abloy. The brand produces a range of residential lock products, including tubular locks, interior door knobs and levers, key locking hardware sets, electronic keyless locks, deadbolts, hinges, dutch door bolts and Mortise locks. They are represented by dealers and showrooms in the United States, Latin America and Canada. They also provide cabinet and drawer pulls for interior spaces like Kitchen cabinets and bathroom cabinets.

History
Beginning in the mid-1980s, the company began making a limited range of solid brass door levers for specialty hardware dealers in the Los Angeles area. Emtek is based in City of Industry, where it has three facilities for product assembly, shipping, management, and customer service.

Emtek was acquired by Swedish conglomerate ASSA ABLOY in 1999, the largest lock manufacturing company in the world.

Emtek's product range is offered in 17 finish options and in a variety of styles, including several digital keypads and modern keyless entry devices.

They also manufacture cabinet hardware including a range of cabinet pulls, crystal, and colored crystal knobs

Media  
Emtek's products have been featured in interior design magazines like HGTV magazine, This Old House, Architectural Digest, Elle Decor, House Beautiful, and Veranda, in online publications like Design Milk  as well as in consumer publications like the Washington Post.

Their hardware is also featured in HGTV Star Vern Yip's book "Design Wise: Your Smart Guide to A Beautiful Home".

In collaboration with L.A. based designers Commune (designers), Emtek was the hardware provider for the Architectural Digest Oscar Green Room in 2015.

Awards 
 Interior Design Magazine's 2014 Best of the Year award for hardware (Modern Crystal knob) 
 The Good Design Awards from the Chicago Athenaeum 2017 for hardware (Stretto 1.5x5 rosette)

Leadership 
 Founding CEO: Tom Millar
 Current President of the ASSA ABLOY Mechanical Residential Hardware Group (including Yale Home): Jason Chau
 Emtek's parent company, ASSA ABLOY has ranked on Forbes’ “The World’s Most Innovative Companies” list 3 times since 2013, including at #90 in 2016.

References

External links 
 Official Emtek website

Lock manufacturers
Bathroom fixture companies
Doors
Kitchen manufacturers
Manufacturing companies based in Los Angeles
Companies based in the City of Industry, California
Manufacturing companies established in 1981
1981 establishments in California
American subsidiaries of foreign companies